Arawak FC is a Barthéloméen football club. The club plays in the Saint-Barthelemy Championships, where they finished 2nd during the 2014–15 season.

References

External links 
 FC Arawak official website
 

Arawak